This article lists lists of radio programs in different countries:

List of Canadian radio programs
List of Estonian radio programs
List of UK radio programmes
List of U.S. radio programs